Only Human was Hal Crook's third album as a leader, and the first album he released for RAM Records. It was recorded on June 11, 1993, at Sound Techniques in Boston, Massachusetts. None of the music had been rehearsed, and the session produced 11 tracks. In addition to the 6 tracks released on this album, the remaining 5 were planned for a second album. Although this second album was never released, it was assigned a title and catalog number by RAM Records: Stardust, RMCD 4516.

Track listing 
Show – 10:08
Only Human – 10:25
Brazil – 9:02
Soulmates – 7:37
Suddenly It’s Spring – 9:57
Outer Edge – 6:26

Personnel
Hal Crook — trombone
John Lockwood — bass
Bob Gullotti — drums

References

1993 albums
Hal Crook albums